The 1981 Utah State Aggies football team represented Utah State University during the 1981 NCAA Division I-A football season as a member of the Pacific Coast Athletic Association (PCAA). The Aggies were led by sixth-year head coach Bruce Snyder and played their home games at Romney Stadium in Logan, Utah. They finished the season with a record of five wins, five losses, and one tie (5–5–1, 4–1 PCAA).

Schedule

References

Utah State
Utah State Aggies football seasons
Utah State Aggies football